Six Feet Deep was an American punk and heavy metal band started in 1991, which became popular in the mid-west United States due to success of their debut album. A review on Cross Rhythms of the band's album, Struggle was a 10/10 review. Their second album, The Road Less Traveled, made Sputnik Music's No. 5 on the "Metalcore Bible: Part 1".

History
The band started in 1991, with members Myk Porter, Tom Wohlfield, Matt Simmons, and Mike Shaffer. They recorded their first demo, which was titled Self EP and Struggle with this line-up. Johnny Amanse joined the band for a brief time and decided to leave to spend more time with his family.

Shaffer and Simmons left the band and were replaced by Bryan Gray and Matt Traxler, who recorded on The Road Less Traveled. The band disbanded due to Porter wanting to change the band's musical style. Porter and Traxler later went on to form Brandtson, with Bryan Gray going on to join the Blamed, Left Out, and Blenderhead.

Members
Last known line-up
Myk Porter – vocals (1991–1997)
Matt Traxler – guitar (1996–1997)
Mike Shaffer – guitar (1991–1997)
Bryan Gray – bass (1996–1997)
Tom A. Wohlfield – drums, percussion (1991–1997)

Former members
Matthew Alan Simmons – bass (1991–1996)
Johnny Amanse – guitar (1994–1995)

Live musicians
Daren Diolosa – guitar (1994)

Discography 
Studio albums
 Struggle (1994; R.E.X. Records)
 The Road Less Traveled (1997)

EPs
 Self EP (1992; Independent)

References

External links
 R.E.X. Records article that mentioned Six Feet Deep

Musical groups established in 1991
Musical groups disestablished in 1997
Musical quartets
1991 establishments in Ohio